Canyon is an unincorporated community in Northland Township, Saint Louis County, Minnesota, United States.

The community is located 27 miles north of the city of Duluth at the junction of U.S. Highway 53 and Harris Road (County Road 737).

Canyon is located between the cities of Duluth and Virginia on U.S. Highway 53.

Hellwig Creek flows through the community.

References

 Rand McNally Road Atlas – 2007 edition – Minnesota entry
 Official State of Minnesota Highway Map – 2011/2012 edition

Unincorporated communities in Minnesota
Unincorporated communities in St. Louis County, Minnesota